This list is a legal bibliography.

A book can be included on this list only if it meets these criteria:
(1) The book is already in an existing legal bibliography that is a reliable source.
(2) Although the book is not in such a bibliography, at least one reliable source says the book is suitable for inclusion in such a bibliography.

In other words, this bibliography includes books that only reliable, authoritative sources have said must, should be, or could be in a reliable legal bibliography.

A Bibliographical Guide to the Law of the United Kingdom, the Channel Islands, and the Isle of Man
A First Book of English Law
A Legal Bibliography of the British Commonwealth of Nations
Archbold Criminal Pleading, Evidence and Practice
Atiyah's Accidents, Compensation and the Law
Austin, The Province of Jurisprudence Determined
Bacon's Abridgement
Bailey's Law of Wills
Beaumanoir, Coutumes de Beauvaisis
Black Book of the Admiralty
Black's Law Dictionary
Blackstone, A Discourse on the Study of the Law
Blackstone, An Analysis of the Laws of England
Blackstone's Commentaries
Bouvier's Law Dictionary
Bracton, De Legibus et Consuetudinibus Angliae
Bridgman's Legal Bibliography
Britton
Brooke's Abridgment
Brunner, The Sources of English Law
Butterworth's Annotated Legislation Service
Card, Cross and Jones: Criminal Law
Chronological Table of the Statutes
Coke's Institutes
Comyns' Digest
Cowley, A Bibliography of Abridgments, Digests, Dictionaries, and Indexes of English Law to the Year 1800
Current Law Statutes Annotated
Daniel, History and Origin of the Law Reports
D'Anvers' Abridgment
Davis' Criminal Law Consolidation Acts
Dworkin, Taking Rights Seriously
Encyclopaedia of Forms and Precedents
Ensor, Defects of the English Laws and Tribunals
Fitzherbert, New Natura Brevium
Fitzherbert's Abridgment
Fleta
Foss, Biographia Juridica
Foster's Crown Law
Fox, Handbook of English Law Reports
Friend, Anglo-American Legal Bibliographies
Gilmore, The Death of Contract
Glanvill
Grotius, De jure belli ac pacis
Hale, Historia Placitorum Coronae
Halsbury's Laws of England
Halsbury's Statutes
Halsbury's Statutory Instruments
Hart, The Concept of Law
Hawkins' Pleas of the Crown
Hoffman's Course of Legal Study
Hollond, English Legal Authors Before Blackstone
Holmes, The Common Law
Ilbert, Legislative Methods and Forms
Information Sources in Law
Jelf, Where to Find Your Law
Kelsen, Pure Theory of Law
Kent's Commentaries
Law Books in Print
Lawyers' Law Books
Maine, Ancient Law
Marvin's Legal Bibliography
Moran, The Alphabet of the National Insurance Act, 1911.
Moran, The Boarding House Proprietor and His Guest
Moran, The Heralds of the Law
Odgers on Libel and Slander
Rastall, The Abbreviacion of Statutis
Rastall, Termes de la Ley
Russell on Crime
Rolle's Abridgment
Select Essays in Anglo-American Legal History
Simpson, Biographical Dictionary of the Common Law
Szladits' Bibliography on Foreign and Comparative Law
St Germain, Doctor and Student
Stair, Institutions of the Law of Scotland
Statutes in Force
Stone's Justices' Manual
Stroud's Judicial Dictionary
The Digest
Vattel, Les droit des gens
Viner's Abridgment
Wallace's Reporters
Wheaton, Elements of International Law
Williams, Learning the Law
Winfield, The Chief Sources of English Legal History
Where to Look for Your Law
Words and Phrases Legally Defined

See also
Military Law Literature in India

References

External links

Wikipedia articles which are legal bibliographies